Mia Julia Brückner (born 9 December 1986), best known as Mia Magma, Mia Julia and Fellucia, is a German pornographic actress.

Early life
Born in Gilching, Bavaria, Magma debuted in adult industry in December 2010, starring in the film Das Sennenlutschi. She had previously attended several swinger clubs together with her husband Peter, a former insurance agent, who later became her manager and an occasional actor in her films.

Career

Magma's life-size image appeared at the 2011 24 Hours Nürburgring on a BMW touring car sponsored by pornographic company Magmafilm, and she even attended the event as a special guest. In Summer 2012, she was also part of the 2012 touring music show Bierkönig.

In late 2011, Magma also appeared on the K.I.Z music video of the song "Fremdgehen", and featured a series of commercials for the airline Germanwings.

In September 2012, Magma announced her retirement from pornography to pursue a career in music and television with the new stage name Mia Miya. For this reason she even withdrew a Venus Award nomination.

Magma appeared on several magazine covers, including the May 2012 German issue of FHM and the October 2012 German issue of Penthouse.

In 2014, she was a contestant at Sat.1's Celebrity Big Brother Germany.

Magma continues to release pornographic content on OnlyFans.

Awards
 Eroticline Award 2010 – Best German Newcomer

References

External links
 
 
 

1986 births
Living people
German pornographic film actresses
German female adult models
People from Starnberg (district)
21st-century German women singers
Actors from Bavaria